Gosunda Dam is an artificial reservoir about 10 kilometres from Chittorgarh

References

Dams in Rajasthan
Year of establishment missing